George Henry "Prunes" Moolic (March 12, 1867, in Lawrence, Massachusetts – February 19, 1915, in Lawrence, Massachusetts) was a professional baseball player who played catcher in the Major Leagues in 1886. He played for the Chicago White Stockings and with a local team of the New England League and with a club from Meriden, Connecticut.

Moolic died on February 19, 1915, at the age of 47. He had been suffering from a nasal hemorrhage for three weeks. He is buried in St. Mary Cemetery in Lawrence, Massachusetts.

References

External links

1865 births
1915 deaths
19th-century baseball players
Major League Baseball catchers
Minor league baseball managers
Chicago White Stockings players
Baseball players from Massachusetts
Sportspeople from Lawrence, Massachusetts
Lawrence (minor league baseball) players
Meriden Maroons players
Boston Blues players
Haverhill (minor league baseball) players
New Orleans Pelicans (baseball) players
Sioux City Corn Huskers players
Hartford (minor league baseball) players
Norwalk (minor league baseball) players
Newark Little Giants players